Lausanne Township is a township in Carbon County, Pennsylvania. It is part of Northeastern Pennsylvania. The township dates back to 1808 when the first Lausanne settlement was organized with a local frontier government.

History
The original population of Lausanne Landing was quite variable limited to a handful of year-round settlers and varying groups of itinerant workmen from expeditions sent to log, mine, or build boats. The current town population was 237 at the 2010 census. The township was named after Lausanne, in Switzerland and the bowl shaped valley near its first settlement at Lausanne Landing has often been called the Switzerland of America.

Geography
The township is located along the northern border of Carbon County, with Luzerne County to the north. It lies in a valley bordered by the parallel ridges of Buck Mountain to the north and Round Head Mountain to the south. Its only village is Buck Mountain, at the base of the mountain with the same name.  Historically, it began as part of the original Northampton County, which was larger than New Jersey, with a township centered at Lausanne Landing and consisted of the lands in most of what is now Carbon County.

It is part of the Lehigh River watershed.

Lausanne has a warm-summer humid continental climate (Dfb) and the hardiness zones are 5b and 6a. Average monthly temperatures in Buck Mountain range from 24.4 °F in January to 69.7 °F in July.

Neighboring municipalities
Lehigh Township (east and south)
Weatherly (southwest)
Banks Township (west)
Foster Township, Luzerne County (north)

History

Lausanne Township was originally as part of the original Northampton County in the 'Towamensing District', a part of the unorganized wilderness above Blue Mountain.  The Towamensing District was then reorganized in 1808 when the section of the county above Blue Mountain was set out as individual townships, and Schuylkill County was created:

"And a small section of southern Lausanne Twp." was to set a pattern.  The township remained a nurturing organizational government through a number of additional divisions, children split off in the past to attain greater success and populations with ever diminished territory each time it suffered a division. 
 
1842Banks Township erected from the Northwestern part of Lausanne.
1843Carbon County created from Northern Northampton and Monroe Counties.
1847Packer Township set off from Lausanne.
1863Weatherly set off from Lausanne at this time, and becomes the third borough in the county after Mauch Chunk and East Mauch Chunk.
1875Lehigh Township made up of lands along the west bank of the Lehigh River is set off from Lausanne from Glen Onoko north to the Luzerne County line, leaving a small rump community. Both are very rural.

Today, the township is a narrow strip to small to effectively grow or split, wedged against the Luzerne-Carbon County border in rough country.

Transportation

No numbered highways pass through Lausanne Township. The main thoroughfares within the township include Buck Mountain Road and Eckley Road.

Demographics

As of the census of 2000, there were 218 people, 88 households, and 60 families residing in the township.  The population density was 37.7 people per square mile (14.6/km).  There were 109 housing units at an average density of 18.9/sq mi (7.3/km).  The racial makeup of the township was 100.00% White.

There were 88 households, out of which 30.7% had children under the age of 18 living with them, 61.4% were married couples living together, 4.5% had a female householder with no husband present, and 30.7% were non-families. 27.3% of all households were made up of individuals, and 6.8% had someone living alone who was 65 years of age or older.  The average household size was 2.48 and the average family size was 2.97.

In the township the population was spread out, with 22.0% under the age of 18, 6.9% from 18 to 24, 30.3% from 25 to 44, 27.1% from 45 to 64, and 13.8% who were 65 years of age or older.  The median age was 41 years. For every 100 females, there were 98.2 males.  For every 100 females age 18 and over, there were 104.8 males.

The median income for a household in the township was $30,625, and the median income for a family was $42,679. Males had a median income of $30,938 versus $17,212 for females. The per capita income for the township was $16,797.  About 6.2% of families and 11.9% of the population were below the poverty line, including 20.0% of those under the age of eighteen and 5.4% of those sixty five or over.

References

Populated places established in 1808
Townships in Carbon County, Pennsylvania
Townships in Pennsylvania